Jennifer Figge (born November 12, 1952) is an American athlete from Aspen, Colorado. Born in Davenport, Iowa, Figge is the daughter of opera singer Margherita Roberti. In early 2009 for 24 days ending on February 5 she swam several sections of the Atlantic Ocean from the Cape Verde Islands off Africa to Chacachacare Island in Trinidad off Venezuela (a total of ), spending much of the time in a shark cage while swimming up to 8 hours a day, battling strong winds and waves up to 30 feet.

Several major media outlets initially erroneously reported she swam the entire distance across the ocean. The claim was challenged by several sources, as mathematically, Figge would have had to swim over  a day at about ten miles per hour – a physical impossibility.  In an interview with the Associated Press, Figge said she "never intended to swim the Atlantic."

See also 
 Guy Delage, who made an unverified claim to have swum across the Atlantic with the help of a kick board
 Benoît Lecomte, the first person to swim across the Atlantic without a kick board
 List of female adventurers

References 

1952 births
Living people
American female swimmers
American long-distance swimmers
History of the Atlantic Ocean
Sportspeople from Aspen, Colorado
Sportspeople from Davenport, Iowa
21st-century American women